This page is an overview of the protected heritage sites in Luxembourg (Belgium), alphabetically ordered by town name. This list is part of the protected heritage sites of Belgium.

List of protected heritage sites, in Arlon
List of protected heritage sites, in Attert
List of protected heritage sites, in Aubange
List of protected heritage sites, in Bastogne
List of protected heritage sites, in Bertogne
List of protected heritage sites, in Bertrix
List of protected heritage sites, in Bouillon
List of protected heritage sites, in Chiny
List of protected heritage sites, in Daverdisse
List of protected heritage sites, in Durbuy
List of protected heritage sites, in Érezée
List of protected heritage sites, in Étalle, Belgium
List of protected heritage sites, in Fauvillers
List of protected heritage sites, in Florenville
List of protected heritage sites, in Gouvy
List of protected heritage sites, in Habay
List of protected heritage sites, in Herbeumont
List of protected heritage sites, in Hotton
List of protected heritage sites, in Houffalize
List of protected heritage sites, in La Roche-en-Ardenne
List of protected heritage sites, in Léglise
List of protected heritage sites, in Libin

List of protected heritage sites, in Libramont-Chevigny
List of protected heritage sites, in Manhay
List of protected heritage sites, in Marche-en-Famenne
List of protected heritage sites, in Martelange
List of protected heritage sites, in Meix-devant-Virton
List of protected heritage sites, in Messancy
List of protected heritage sites, in Musson
List of protected heritage sites, in Nassogne
List of protected heritage sites, in Neufchâteau, Belgium
List of protected heritage sites, in Paliseul
List of protected heritage sites, in Rendeux
List of protected heritage sites, in Rouvroy, Belgium
List of protected heritage sites, in Sainte-Ode
List of protected heritage sites, in Saint-Hubert, Belgium
List of protected heritage sites, in Saint-Léger, Belgium
List of protected heritage sites, in Tellin
List of protected heritage sites, in Tenneville
List of protected heritage sites, in Tintigny
List of protected heritage sites, in Vaux-sur-Sûre
List of protected heritage sites, in Vielsalm
List of protected heritage sites, in Virton
List of protected heritage sites, in Wellin

 
 *Luxembourg